West Heath Hospital is a health facility on Rednal Road in West Heath, West Midlands, England. It is managed by Birmingham Community Healthcare NHS Foundation Trust.

History
The facility was established as the Kings Norton Infectious Diseases Hospital in 1889. Following a reduction in smallpox cases to very low levels in the United Kingdom, it became a tuberculosis hospital in 1910 and, after joining the National Health Service in 1948, it was renamed West Heath Hospital in 1954. A kitchen block was added in 1956 and it became a geriatric hospital in 1980. After modern facilities had been built on the site, the original 19th century building was withdrawn from use and demolished in 2008.

References

Hospitals in Birmingham, West Midlands
Hospitals established in 1889
1889 establishments in England
NHS hospitals in England
Tuberculosis sanatoria in the United Kingdom